The Starlet Stakes is a Grade I American Thoroughbred horse race for two-year-old fillies run over a distance of one and one sixteenth miles ( furlongs) on the dirt held annually in early December at Los Alamitos Race Course in Cypress, California. The event currently offers a purse of $300,000.

History

The inaugural running of the event was during the spring meeting of 1979, on 13 April at Hollywood Park Racetrack in Inglewood, California as a 6 furlong sprint for three-year-olds. The event was won by Eloquent who was ridden by the US Hall of Fame jockey Donald Pierce and trained by US Hall of Fame trainer Lazaro S. Barrera in a time of 1:09 flat.

The event was not run the following. In 1981 the administration of Hollywood Park Racetrack decided to hold two new two-year-old events at the end of the racing season with one for colts and geldings, Hollywood Futurity and for fillies the Hollywood Starlet Stakes. The races were held on consecutive weekends with the Hollywood Starlet Stakes run on 21 November while the Futurity was held on 28 November.

With high stakes that were offered for the race the event attracted many fine two-year-old fillies. Within two years, in 1983 the American Graded Stakes Committee classified the event with the highest grading of Grade I. That year the US Hall of Fame trainer D. Wayne Lukas saddled the first of eight victories in the event with Althea winning and US Hall of Fame jockey Laffit Pincay Jr. in the reins. Althea would be voted an Eclipse Award as the American Champion Two-Year-Old Filly for 1983. 
 
In 1984 the Breeders' Cup was initiated and held at Hollywood Park, the winner by protest of the Breeders' Cup Juvenile Fillies, Outstandingly would three weeks later confirm her dominance with another win over Fran's Valentine to win the Hollywood Starlet and capture US Champion Two-Year-Old Filly honors.

In 1985 the distance of the event was decreased to one mile. After six runnings the distance was reverted back to a distance of  miles.

In 2003, Hollywood Story became the first maiden to win the Starlet in the history of the event.

In 2006 the event was run on a new synthetic Cushion Track which was installed at Hollywood Park.

With the closure of Hollywood Park Racetrack in 2013 the event was moved Los Alamitos Race Course and renamed to the Starlet Stakes.

The Starlet Stakes is the final major race of the year for young fillies and is frequented by horses coming out of the Breeders' Cup Juvenile Fillies.

As a supplementary entry of $10,000 Abel Tasman started at 13-1 and won the event in 2016. The following year Abel Tasman had an excellent season winning three Grade I events including the Kentucky Oaks and was voted US Champion 3-Year-Old Filly.

Records
Speed  record:
  miles (dirt): 1:41.82 - Splendid Blended  (2004)
  miles (synthetic): 1:40.54 - Country Star (2007)
 1 mile:  1:35.00 – Stocks Up (1998)

Margins: 
 11 lengths – Love Lock (1997)

Most wins by an owner:
  3 – Baoma Corporation (2019, 2020, 2021)

Most wins by a jockey:
 4 – Corey Nakatani   (1992, 1994, 1995, 1996)
 4 – Drayden Van Dyke (2017, 2018, 2019, 2020)

Most wins by a trainer:
 9 – Bob Baffert (1998, 2001, 2013, 2017, 2018, 2019, 2020, 2021, 2022)

Winners

Legend:

 
 

Notes:

§ Ran as an entry

See also
 List of American and Canadian Graded races
Road to the Kentucky Oaks

References

Horse races in California
Los Alamitos, California
Flat horse races for two-year-old fillies
Grade 1 stakes races in the United States
Graded stakes races in the United States
1979 establishments in California